is a Japanese figure skating coach and former competitor. He competed in Ice Dancing with Aya Kawai and Kayo Shirahata. Tanaka and Kawai placed 23rd in the 1998 Winter Olympic Games. They were two-time Japanese national champions.

Results
GP: Champions Series / Grand Prix

With Kawai

With Shirahata

References 
1998 Japanese Olympic Committee - Hiroshi Tanaka profile

1972 births
Living people
Sportspeople from Yokohama
Japanese male ice dancers
Olympic figure skaters of Japan
Figure skaters at the 1998 Winter Olympics
Asian Games medalists in figure skating
Figure skaters at the 1996 Asian Winter Games

Medalists at the 1996 Asian Winter Games
Asian Games silver medalists for Japan
Competitors at the 1997 Winter Universiade